Naoia is a village in Ancuabe District in Cabo Delgado Province in northeastern Mozambique.

References

External links 
Satellite map at Maplandia.com 

Populated places in Ancuabe District